Michal Šanda (born 10 December 1965, in Prague) is a Czech writer and poet.

Life 
After secondary school, he made his living in a series of jobs that included stonemasonry, bookselling, street vending, fowling and organ-grinding, as well as making fans on an ostrich farm and painting railway cars. Since 1991, he has worked as an archivist at the Arts and Theatre Institute in Prague where he lives.

Although he started off as a poet, Michal Šanda is today regarded as a postmodern author because every book he writes explores a different genre and style.

Bibliography

Poetry collections 
 stoa, KIC Brno, (1994)
 Ošklivé příběhy z krásných slov, Protis Prague, (1996)
 Metro, Protis Prague, (1998 and 2005)
 Dvacet deka ovaru, Klokočí a Knihovna Jana Drdy Prague, (1998)
 Býkárna, Druhé město Brno, with Milan Ohnisko and Ivan Wernisch, (2006)
 Remington pod kredencí, Protis Prague, (2009)
 Rabování samozvaného generála Rona Zacapy v hostinci U Hrocha, Nakladatelství Pavel Mervart Červený Kostelec, (2015)

Prose 
 Blues 1890–1940, Petrov Brno, (2000)
 Obecní radní Stoklasné Lhoty vydraživší za 37 Kč vycpaného jezevce pro potřeby školního kabinetu, Petrov Brno, (2001)
 Sudamerická romance, Petrov Brno, (2003)
 Kecanice, Protis Prague, (2006)
 Dopisy, Dybbuk Prague, with Karel Havlíček Borovský, (2009)
 Sebrané spí si, Nakladatelství Petr Štengl Prague, (2012)
 Špacírkou přes čenich!, Nakladatelství Paseka Prague and Litomyšl, (2013)
 MUDr. PhDr. Jarmila Beichtenová: Kazuistika pacientů Michala Šandy a Jakuba Šofara – literární anamnéza, Novela bohemica Prague, (2014)
 Jakápak prdel, Týnská literární kavárna Prague,  and Druhé město Brno, (2015) with Ivan Wernisch
 Autorské poznámky k divadelní grotesce Sráči, Nakladatelství Petr Štengl Prague, (2015)
 Masná kuchařka mistra řezníka z Nelahozevsi Antonína Dvořáka, Dybbuk Prague, (2016)
 Hemingwayův býk, Milan Hodek | Paper Jam Hradec Králové, (2018)
 Umyvadlo plné vajglů, Dybbuk Prague, (2020)
 Generál v umyvadle plném blues, Větrné mlýny, Brno, (2022)

Children's Books 
 Merekvice, Dybbuk, Prague, (2008)
 Oskarovy rybářské trofeje, Novela bohemica Prague, (2014)
 Dr. Moul, Michal Šanda at its own expense Prague, (2018)
 Kosáku, co to máš v zobáku?, Meander Prague , (2019) 
 Rukulíbám, Meander Prague , (2020)
 Tibbles, Meander Prague , (2021)
 Viktor & Віктор, Meander Prague, (2022)

Theater Plays 
 Španělské ptáčky, Větrné mlýny Brno, ISSN 1213-7022, (2006)
 Sorento, Větrné mlýny Brno, (2011)

External links 
 Michal Šanda, official page

References

Czech poets
Czech male poets
Writers from Prague
1965 births
Living people
Czech monarchists